Harthill is a village in the Metropolitan Borough of Rotherham (part of South Yorkshire, England), on the border with Derbyshire. In the 2001 census, the civil parish of Harthill with Woodall had a population of 1,909, reducing slightly to 1,879 at the 2011 Census.

Harthill is traditionally an agricultural village, although there is also a history of quarrying whetstones for use in knife-sharpening.

The parish church of All Hallows dates from 1085, when it was commissioned by William de Warenne. The tower is 14th century. The Dukes of Leeds, major landowners in the area, and their families, are interred in the crypt.

Harthill has two public houses: the Beehive and the Blue Bell.

Harthill is the principal village in the civil parish of Harthill with Woodall. The parish also contains Harthill Reservoir, which feeds the Chesterfield Canal, Nor Wood, and the hamlet of Woodall with its M1 motorway service station. The reservoir was constructed in 1796 and in 2020 the Canals and Rivers Trust announced a £5 million programme of works to upgrade the overflow spillway of the earth dam. The reservoir provides leisure facilities for Rotherham Sailing Club, Yorkshire Outdoor Swimmers and fishing.

The village is served by several public transport routes. First South Yorkshire operate the hourly service X54 to Sheffield from Monday to Saturday, with TM Travel operating it on Sundays. First also run service 29 to Rotherham between Monday and Saturday, with TM Travel operating service 29a on evenings and Sundays. Stagecoach also operate the circular route 26/26a during Monday to Saturday daytime, connecting Harthill with Crystal Peaks. There is also a 1-a-day service to the Hallamshire Hospital in the form of service X30; this is run by TM Travel, Monday to Saturday at 7 am.

Exploratory drilling rig
At a planning appeal in June 2018, the inspector (appointed by the Secretary of State for Communities and Local Government) granted planning permission for exploration at Harthill by means of  It was explained during the enquiry that the currently authorized investigative well would not involve 'fracking'.

See also
Listed buildings in Harthill with Woodall

References

External links

Villages in South Yorkshire
Geography of the Metropolitan Borough of Rotherham